Miss Virginia is an 2019 American drama film directed by R.J. Daniel Hanna and starring Uzo Aduba in a title role as a struggling inner-city mother who sacrifices everything to give her son a good education. Supporting cast include Matthew Modine, Niles Fitch, Amirah Vann, Adina Porter, Aunjanue Ellis, and Vanessa Williams. The film is based on a true story.

The film released on October 18, 2019 by Vertical Entertainment. Miss Virginia received mixed reviews from critics, earning praise for Aduba's performance but criticism for muddling the politics of school vouchers.

Cast 
Uzo Aduba as Virginia Walden
Matthew Modine as Congressman Cliff Williams
Niles Fitch as James Walden
Amirah Vann as Shondae Smith
Adina Porter as Annette Johnson
Aunjanue Ellis as Congresswoman Lorraine Townsend
Vanessa Williams as Sally Rae 
Samantha Sloyan as Mrs. Watson
Kimberly Hébert Gregory as Tasha White
Erik LaRay Harvey as Mayor Anthony Carver

Production
Production began in November 2017, when Uzo Aduba was cast in a leading role. In April 2018, Matthew Modine, Aunjanue Ellis, Vanessa Williams and Kimberly Hébert Gregory joined the cast and filming began later that month in Los Angeles.

Miss Virginia was the first narrative production of the Moving Picture Institute, and one of several MPI films that push for school choice programs. MPI has received support from school choice supporter and Republican political donor Rebekah Mercer, who was also previously on its board.

Reception
On review aggregator website Rotten Tomatoes, the film holds an approval rating of  based on  reviews.

References

External links

American drama films
2019 films
Films shot in Los Angeles
Films about racism
2010s English-language films
2010s American films